The Woman of His Dream is a 1921 British silent drama film directed by Harold M. Shaw and starring Mary Dibley, Alec Fraser and Sydney Seaward. It was adapted from a short story by Ethel M. Dell.

Cast
 Mary Dibley - Naomi 
 Alec Fraser - Reginald Carey 
 Sydney Seaward - Jeffrey Coningby 
 Fred Thatcher - Charles Rivers 
 Teddy Arundell - Adm Rivers 
 Winifred Harris - Lady Emberdale 
 Betty Howe - Gwen Emberdale 
 John East - Fisherman

References

External links

1921 films
1921 drama films
British drama films
British silent feature films
Films directed by Harold M. Shaw
Films based on works by Ethel M. Dell
Films based on short fiction
British black-and-white films
1920s English-language films
1920s British films
Silent drama films